Louis Abel-Truchet (29 December 1857  9 September 1918) was a French painter and poster artist. He was known for landscapes, genre scenes and depictions of Parisian nightlife.

Biography 
He was a student of Jean-Joseph Benjamin-Constant and Jules Lefebvre at the Académie Julian. His first exhibition came in 1891. He was one of the first exhibitors at the Salon d'Automne in 1903. He and  created the "Société des humoristes" in 1907.

In 1910, he became a member of the Société Nationale des Beaux-Arts. The following year, he was named a Knight in the Legion of Honor.

In addition to his artistic works, he created designs for public festivities, notably the satirical  of 1896 and 1897; designing floats for the Cabaret des Quat'z'Arts. 

The army made use of his skills as a painter by appointing him as an assistant to Guirand de Scevola, head of the newly created Camouflage Division. He initially worked in Paris, helping to organize the central workshop. During this time, he continued to work as an artist, drawing caricatures for Le Petit Journal.

Shortly before the end of the war, he was wounded and died at a military hospital in Auxerre. In 1919, his works were part of an exhibit at the Salon d'Automne, honoring artists who had died in the war.

After his death, his widow, the painter , took over his workshop in Montmartre and became a portrait painter.

A street in the 17th arrondissement of Paris is named after him.

References

Further reading 
 Cécile Coutin, Tromper l'ennemi : l'invention du camouflage moderne en 1914-1918, Éditions Pierre de Taillac, 2012

External links 

More works by Abel-Truchet @ ArtNet
Posters by Abel-Truchet @ Gallica

1857 births
1918 deaths
19th-century French painters
French poster artists
French genre painters
Académie Julian
Artists from Versailles
French military personnel killed in World War I
20th-century French painters
French Army officers
Camoufleurs
Recipients of the Legion of Honour